The 1948 Dixie  Bowl was a post-season college football bowl game between the Arkansas Razorbacks and the William & Mary Indians. In the inaugural Dixie Bowl, Arkansas defeated William & Mary, who was ranked fourteenth by the AP Poll, 21–19. The final Dixie Bowl was played on 1949. William & Mary would get their revenge for the game the next year, a 9–0 win in Little Rock, and again in a 20–0 win in Little Rock.

Setting
Arkansas entered the game with a 1–4–1 record in the Southwest Conference, with four non conference wins boosting their record to 5–4–1. William & Mary was 9–1 entering the game.

Game summary
The William & Mary Indians took an early lead when they recovered a fumbled quick-kick, which led to a Jack Cloud touchdown run. Cloud scored again, but the extra point was missed by Indian quarterback Stan Magdziak. Down by 13, Arkansas quarterback Kenny Holland connected with Ross Pritchard for a 59-yard touchdown pass. After a completed extra point by Aubrey Fowler, Hog defender Melvin McGaha intercepted a Magdziak pass, and returned it for a 70-yard touchdown. Fowler again added the PAT, giving the Razorbacks a 14–13 lead.

The Indians struck again in the third quarter, when Magdziak hit Henry Bland for a touchdown, but the extra point was no good for a second time. Arkansas would strike last, however, when Leon Campbell's 7-yard touchdown run gave the Hogs the lead with five minutes remaining. Arkansas moved their bowl record to 1–0–2 with the win, while William & Mary dropped to 0–1.

Scoring summary

References

Dixie Bowl
Dixie Bowl
Arkansas Razorbacks football bowl games
William & Mary Tribe football bowl games
January 1948 sports events in the United States
Dixie Bowl